Fiona Anna Wood is an Australian writer of young adult fiction. She is a three-time winner of the Children's Book of the Year Award: Older Readers award.

Career 
Fiona Wood is a graduate of the University of Melbourne. She worked for 12 years as a scriptwriter for television series, including episodes of Neighbours, Home and Away and MDA, before her first novel, Six Impossible Things, was published in 2010.

Works

Awards and recognition 

 Six Impossible Things
 Winner, Eleanor Dark Flagship Fellowship for Fiction, 2008
 Shortlisted, CBCA (Children’s Book Council of Australia) Book of the Year, Older Readers, 2011
 Shortlisted, YABBA (Young Australians Best Book Awards), 2014
 Shortlisted, YABBA (Young Australians Best Book Awards), 2016

 Wildlife
 Shortlisted, Queensland Literary Awards, Young Adult Book Award, 2013
 Shortlisted, Victorian Premier's Literary Awards, Young Adult Fiction Award, 2014
 Shortlisted, NSW Premier's Literary Award, Ethel Turner Prize, 2014
 Winner, CBCA Book of the Year, Older Readers, 2014
 Shortlisted, Reading & Enjoying Australian Literature (REAL) Awards, Fiction for Year 7–9, 2015
 Honour book, Kids Own Australian Literature Awards (KOALAs), Fiction for years 7–9, 2015

 Cloudwish

 Winner, Indie Award, Best Young Adult (Independent Booksellers Awards), 2016
 Winner, CBCA Book of the Year, Older Readers, 2016
 Shortlisted, ABIA Awards (Australian Book Industry Awards)
 Shortlisted, WA Young Readers' Book Award

 Take Three Girls

 Winner, CBCA, Book of the Year, Older Readers, 2018
 Shortlisted, Gold Inky Award
 Shortlisted, Indie Award (Independent Booksellers Awards)

References

External links 
 Official website
 

Living people
Year of birth missing (living people)
Australian writers of young adult literature
Australian women novelists
University of Melbourne alumni